Fernando González Peña (born 26 April 2001) is a Mexican professional footballer who plays as a midfielder for Liga MX club UANL.

Career statistics

Club

References

External links
 
 
 

Living people
2001 births
Association football midfielders
Liga MX players
Tigres UANL footballers
Footballers from Morelos
Sportspeople from Cuernavaca
Mexican footballers